"Fallen" is a song recorded by American R&B singer Sevyn Streeter featuring Ty Dolla $ign and Cam Wallace from her debut studio album, Girl Disrupted (2017). The song was released as the third single on January 27, 2017 through Atlantic Records. The song samples "If It Isn't Love" by New Edition.

Reception
Devon Jefferson from Hot New Hip Hop reviewed the song "Sevyn Streeter's fingers have been pressed to the grindstone as of late. Additionally, the artist vowed to share a new song each month in anticipation of the album and today she honors that promise with her new moody single featuring Ty Dolla $ign and Cam Wallace titled "Fallen." The three singers harmonize with each other beautifully as they take us on a sultry journey and detail the gripping reality of falling for that special someone.

Singersroom stated in their review of the song "Like her previous offerings, “Fallen” is relationship-driven, seductive, and raw. “If you keep on putting it down, you gon’ make me love you / If you keep on putting it down, you gon’ make me stay,” she sings.

Music video
The music video was released to YouTube on January 30, 2017.

Track listings and formats

Release history

References

2017 singles
2017 songs
Sevyn Streeter songs
Atlantic Records singles
Ty Dolla Sign songs
Songs written by Sevyn Streeter
Songs written by Ty Dolla Sign
Songs written by Jimmy Jam and Terry Lewis
Songs written by Daryl Simmons
Songs written by Babyface (musician)